Rage Against the Machine (often abbreviated as RATM or shortened to simply Rage) is an American rock band from Los Angeles, California. Formed in 1991, the group consists of vocalist Zack de la Rocha, bassist and backing vocalist Tim Commerford, guitarist Tom Morello, and drummer Brad Wilk. The band is known for melding heavy metal and rap music with punk rock and funk influences, as well as their revolutionary socialist political views. As of 2010, they have sold over 16 million records worldwide. The band was nominated for induction into the Rock & Roll Hall of Fame in their first year of eligibility in 2017, then again in 2018, 2019, and 2021, though the bids failed.

Rage Against the Machine released its self-titled debut album in 1992 to critical acclaim, and achieved commercial success following their performances at the 1993 Lollapalooza festival; in 2003, the album was ranked number 368 on Rolling Stone's list of the 500 greatest albums of all time. The band's next two albums, Evil Empire (1996) and The Battle of Los Angeles (1999), were also successful; both albums topped the Billboard 200 chart. During their initial nine-year run, Rage Against the Machine became a popular and influential band, and had a large influence on the nu metal genre which came to prominence during the late 1990s and early 2000s. They were also ranked No. 33 on VH1's 100 Greatest Artists of Hard Rock.

In 2000, Rage Against the Machine released the cover album Renegades and disbanded after growing creative differences led to De la Rocha's departure. De la Rocha started a low-profile solo career, while the rest of the band formed the rock supergroup Audioslave with Chris Cornell, the former frontman of Soundgarden; Audioslave recorded three albums before disbanding in 2007. The same year, Rage Against the Machine announced a reunion and performed together for the first time in seven years at the Coachella Valley Music and Arts Festival in April 2007. Within the next four years, minus a sabbatical in 2009, the band continued to perform at more live venues and festivals around the world before going on hiatus once again in 2011. In 2016, Morello, Commerford and Wilk formed a new band, Prophets of Rage, with B-Real, Chuck D, and DJ Lord; that band released one EP and one full-length studio album before disbanding in 2019.

After an eight-year hiatus, Rage Against the Machine announced in November 2019 that they were reuniting for a world tour, which was initially scheduled to start in 2020, but was ultimately postponed to 2021, and then to 2022, due to the COVID-19 pandemic.

History

1991–1992: Early years 

In 1991, following the break-up of guitarist Tom Morello's former band Lock Up, former Lock Up drummer Jon Knox encouraged Tim Commerford and Zack de la Rocha to jam with Morello as he was looking to start a new group. Morello soon contacted Brad Wilk, who had unsuccessful auditions for both Lock Up and the band that would later become Pearl Jam. This lineup named themselves Rage Against the Machine, after a song de la Rocha had written for his former underground hardcore punk band Inside Out (also to be the title of the unrecorded Inside Out full-length album). Kent McClard, with whom Inside Out were associated, had coined the phrase "rage against the machine" in a 1989 article in his zine No Answers.

The blueprint for the group's major-label debut album, demo tape Rage Against the Machine, was laid on a twelve-song self-released cassette, the cover image of which featured newspaper clippings of the stockmarket section with a single match taped to the inlay card. Not all 12 songs made it onto the final album—two were eventually included as B-sides, while three others never saw an official release. Several record labels expressed interest, and the band eventually signed with Epic Records. Morello said, "Epic agreed to everything we asked—and they've followed through ... We never saw a[n] [ideological] conflict as long as we maintained creative control."

1992–1994: Rage Against the Machine 

The band's debut album, Rage Against the Machine, was released in November 1992. The album's cover featured Malcolm Browne's Pulitzer Prize-winning photograph of Thích Quảng Đức, a Vietnamese Buddhist monk, burning himself to death in Saigon in 1963 in protest of the murder of Buddhists by the U.S.-backed Prime Minister Ngô Đình Diệm's regime. The album was produced by Garth Richardson.

While sales of the album were initially slow, the album became a critical and commercial success, driven by heavy radio play of the song "Killing in the Name", a heavy, driving track featuring only eight lines of lyrics. The "Fuck You" version, which contains 17 instances of the word fuck, was once accidentally played on the BBC Radio 1 Top 40 singles show on February 21, 1993. The band's profile soared following a notable performance at Lollapalooza during their June to August 1993 tour; sales of Rage Against the Machine in the United States increased from 75,000 before Lollapalooza, to 400,000 by the end of the year. The band further promoted the album with tours supporting Suicidal Tendencies in Europe, and with House of Pain. By April 1996, the album had sold over one million copies in the United States, and three million copies worldwide. The album was later certified triple platinum by the Recording Industry Association of America (RIAA) in May 2000. 

After their debut album, the band appeared on the soundtrack for the film Higher Learning with the song "Year of tha Boomerang". An early version of "Tire Me" also appeared in the movie. Subsequently, they re-recorded the song "Darkness" from their original demo for the soundtrack of The Crow, while "No Shelter" appeared on the Godzilla soundtrack in 1998.

1995–2000: Mainstream success 

In late 1994, Rage Against the Machine took a hiatus from touring, and the band's inactivity sparked rumours that they had broken up. According to an anonymous source reporting to MTV News, Rage Against the Machine had recorded 23 tracks with producer Brendan O'Brien in Atlanta starting in November 1994, and briefly broke up due to violent infighting in the band, before regrouping for the KROQ Weenie Roast in June 1995. Tom Morello later clarified that there had been conflict over the band's musical direction, which were later reconciled. The band eventually recorded their long-awaited follow-up album, Evil Empire, with O'Brien in November and December 1995. Morello stated that, as a result of the band's musical tensions, the album incorporated greater hip hop influences, describing its sound as a "middle ground between Public Enemy and The Clash."

Evil Empire was released on April 16, 1996, and entered the Billboard 200 chart at number one, selling 249,000 copies in its first week. The album later rose to triple platinum status. The song "Bulls on Parade" was performed on Saturday Night Live in April 1996. Their planned two-song performance was cut to one song when the band attempted to hang inverted American flags from their amplifiers ("a sign of distress or great danger"), a protest against having Republican presidential candidate Steve Forbes as guest host on the program that night.

In 1997, the band opened for U2 on their PopMart Tour, for which all of Rage's profits went to support organizations such as the Union of Needletrades, Industrial and Textile Employees, Women Alive and the Zapatista Front for National Liberation. Rage subsequently began an abortive headlining U.S. tour with special guests Wu-Tang Clan. Police in several jurisdictions unsuccessfully attempted to have the concerts cancelled, citing amongst other reasons, the bands' "violent and anti-law enforcement philosophies". Wu-Tang Clan were eventually removed from the lineup and replaced with The Roots when Wu-Tang Clan pulled a no show during a concert at Riverport. On the Japan leg of their tour promoting Evil Empire, a compilation album composed of the band's B-side recordings titled Live & Rare was released by Sony Records. A live video, also titled Rage Against the Machine, was released later the same year.

In 1999, Rage Against the Machine played at the Woodstock '99 concert. The following release, The Battle of Los Angeles also debuted at number one in 1999, selling 450,000 copies in the first week and then going double-platinum. That same year, the song "Wake Up" was featured on the soundtrack of the film The Matrix. The track "Calm Like a Bomb" was later featured in the film's sequel, 2003's The Matrix Reloaded. In 2000, the band planned to support the Beastie Boys on the "Rhyme and Reason" tour; however, the tour was cancelled when Beastie Boys drummer Mike D suffered a serious injury. In 2003, The Battle of Los Angeles was ranked number 426 on Rolling Stones list of the 500 greatest albums of all time.

2000–2006: Break-up and subsequent projects 
On January 26, 2000, an altercation during filming of the video for "Sleep Now in the Fire", directed by Michael Moore, caused the doors of the New York Stock Exchange to be closed and the band to be escorted from the site by security after band members attempted to gain entry into the exchange. The video shoot had attracted several hundred people, according to a representative for the city's Deputy Commissioner for Public Information. New York City's film office does not allow weekday film shoots on Wall Street. Moore had permission to use the steps of Federal Hall National Memorial but did not have a permit to shoot on the sidewalk or the street, nor did he have a loud-noise permit or the proper parking permits. "Michael basically gave us one directorial instruction, "No matter what happens, don't stop playing", Tom Morello recalls. When the band left the steps, police officers apprehended Moore and led him away. Moore yelled to the band, "Take the New York Stock Exchange!" In an interview with the Socialist Worker, Morello said he and scores of others ran into the Stock Exchange. "About two hundred of us got through the first set of doors, but our charge was stopped when the Stock Exchange's titanium riot doors came crashing down." "For a few minutes, Rage Against the Machine was able to shut down American capitalism", Moore said. "An act that I am sure tens of thousands of downsized citizens would cheer".

On September 7, 2000, the band attended the 2000 MTV Video Music Awards, and performed "Testify". After the Best Rock Video award was given to Limp Bizkit, however, Commerford climbed onto the scaffolding of the set. Commerford and his bodyguard were sentenced to a night in jail and de la Rocha reportedly left the awards after the stunt. Morello recalled that Commerford relayed his plan to the rest of the band before the show, and that both de la Rocha and Morello advised him against it immediately after Bizkit was presented the award.

On October 18, 2000, de la Rocha released a statement announcing his departure from the band. He said, "I feel that it is now necessary to leave Rage because our decision-making process has completely failed. It is no longer meeting the aspirations of all four of us collectively as a band, and from my perspective, has undermined our artistic and political ideal." "There was so much squabbling over everything", explained Morello, "and I mean everything. We would even have fist fights over whether our T-shirts should be mauve or camouflaged! It was ridiculous. We were patently political, internally combustible. It was ugly for a long time". de la Rocha's departure from Rage Against the Machine was voted the "Shittiest Thing" of 2000 in the Kerrang! Readers' Poll of that year.

The band's next album, Renegades, was a collection of covers of artists as diverse as Devo, EPMD, Minor Threat, Cypress Hill, the MC5, Afrika Bambaataa, the Rolling Stones, Eric B. & Rakim, Bruce Springsteen, the Stooges, and Bob Dylan. It achieved platinum status a month later. The following year saw the release of another live video, The Battle of Mexico City, while 2003 brought the live album Live at the Grand Olympic Auditorium, an edited recording of the band's final concerts on September 12 and 13, 2000, at the Grand Olympic Auditorium in Los Angeles. It was accompanied by an expanded DVD release of the last show, which included a previously unreleased video for "Bombtrack".
 In the wake of the September 11 attacks, the controversial 2001 Clear Channel memorandum contained a long list of what the memo termed "lyrically questionable" songs for the radio, uniquely listing all of Rage Against the Machine's songs.

After the group's breakup, Morello, Wilk, and Commerford decided to stay together and find a new vocalist. "There was talk for a while of us becoming Ozzy Osbourne's backing band, and even Macy Gray's", said Morello. "We informed them that losing our singer was actually a blessing in disguise, and that we had bigger ambitions than being somebody's hired musicians." Music producer and friend Rick Rubin suggested that they play with Chris Cornell of Soundgarden. Along with Cornell, they formed Audioslave. The first Audioslave single, "Cochise", was released in early November 2002, and a self-titled debut album followed to mainly positive reviews. Compared to Rage Against the Machine, most of Audioslave's music was apolitical, although some songs touched on political issues. Their second album Out of Exile debuted at the number one position on the Billboard charts in 2005. Audioslave released its third album Revelations on September 4, 2006, but an accompanying tour did not occur as Cornell and Morello were working on solo albums. After months of inactivity and rumors of a breakup, Audioslave disbanded on February 15, 2007, after Cornell announced he was leaving the band.

Morello began his own solo career in 2003, playing political acoustic folk music at open-mic nights and various clubs under the alias the Nightwatchman, which he formed as an outlet for his political views while playing apolitical music with Audioslave. He first participated in Billy Bragg's Tell Us the Truth tour with no plans to record, but later recorded a song for Songs and Artists that Inspired Fahrenheit 9/11, "No One Left". In February 2007, he announced a solo album, entitled One Man Revolution, which was released in April 2007. Morello followed up his first studio album with The Fabled City which was released on September 30, 2008. During the latter days of his career as the Nightwatchman, Morello joined up with Boots Riley and formed the rap rock group Street Sweeper Social Club, which released its debut self-titled album in June 2009.

Meanwhile, de la Rocha had been working on a solo album collaboration with DJ Shadow, Company Flow, Roni Size and The Roots' Questlove, but dropped the project in favor of working with Nine Inch Nails' Trent Reznor. Recording was completed but the album has not been released. A collaboration between de la Rocha and DJ Shadow, the song "March of Death" was released for free online in 2003 in protest against the imminent invasion of Iraq, and the 2004 soundtrack Songs and Artists that Inspired Fahrenheit 9/11 included one of the collaborations with Reznor, "We Want It All". In late 2005, de la Rocha was seen singing and playing the jarana huasteca with Son Jarocho band Son de Madera on multiple occasions. Rage Against the Machine was ranked 33rd on VH1's 100 Greatest Artists of Hard Rock list in 2005.

Members of the band had been offered large sums of money to reunite for concerts and tours, and had turned the offers down. Rumors of tension between de la Rocha and the other former band members subsequently circulated, but Commerford said that he and de la Rocha saw each other often and went surfing together, while Morello said he and de la Rocha communicated by phone, and had met up at a September 15, 2005 protest in support of the South Central Farm.

2007–2008: First reunion and tours 

Rumors that Rage Against the Machine could reunite at the Coachella Valley Music and Arts Festival were circulating in mid-January 2007, and were confirmed on January 22. The band was confirmed to be headlining the final day of Coachella 2007. The reunion was described by Morello as primarily being a vehicle to voice the band's opposition to the "right-wing purgatory" the United States had "slid into" under the George W. Bush administration since Rage Against the Machine's dissolution. Though the performance was initially thought to be a one-off, this turned out not to be the case.

On April 14, 2007, Morello and de la Rocha reunited onstage early to perform a brief acoustic set at a Coalition of Immokalee Workers rally in downtown Chicago. Morello described the event as "very exciting for everybody in the room, myself included". This was followed by the scheduled Coachella performance on Sunday, April 29 where the band staged a much anticipated performance in front of an EZLN backdrop to the largest crowds of the festival.

Rage Against the Machine continued to tour in the United States, New Zealand, Australia, and Japan, and also played a series of shows in Europe in Summer 2008 including Rock am Ring and Rock im Park, Pinkpop Festival, T in the Park in Scotland, the Hultsfred Festival in Sweden, the Reading and Leeds Festivals in England and the Oxegen Festival in Ireland. The band also performed on August 2, 2008, in Chicago as one of the headliners (Radiohead, Kanye West and Nine Inch Nails being the other three) for the 2008 Lollapalooza Music Festival. When asked in May 2007 if the band was planning on writing a new album, Morello replied:

Morello declined to comment about the possibility of a new album when interviewed by MTV News in April 2008. In July 2008, it was revealed that de la Rocha had begun a new project called One Day as a Lion with drummer Jon Theodore formerly of The Mars Volta, with an eponymous EP released on July 22, 2008.

In August 2008, de la Rocha revealed his take on the possibility of new material:

In August 2008, during the Democratic National Convention in Denver, Rage headlined the free Tent State Music Festival to End the War. The band was supported by Flobots, State Radio, Jello Biafra, and Wayne Kramer. Following the concert, the band, following uniformed veterans from Iraq Veterans Against the War, led the 8,000 attendees to the Denver Coliseum on a six-mile march to Invesco Field, host of the DNC. After a four-hour stand-off with police, Obama's campaign agreed to meet with members of Iraq Veterans Against the War and hear their demands.

In September 2008, Rage performed at the Target Center in Minneapolis during the Republican National Convention. The previous day, they attempted to play a surprise set at a free anti-RNC concert at the Minnesota Capitol in St. Paul, but were prevented from doing so by the police. Instead, de la Rocha and Morello rapped and sang through a megaphone. Later that evening, Morello and Boots Reilly joined up with Billy Bragg and Jim Walsh for a three-hour jam session at Pepitos Parkway theater in south Minneapolis.

In December 2008, Tom Morello revealed that Rage Against the Machine shows in 2009 were a possibility, although plans for the band to record a new studio album were very unlikely. When asked by Billboard.com whether they planned to head to the studio in 2009, Morello stated: "we've had a wonderful year and a half of playing shows, and I don't see any reason to not play more shows. The thing is there's only so many hours in the musical day, and mine are very occupied right now".

Morello elaborated that the Nightwatchman is now "my principal musical focus, as I see it, for the remainder of my life. From the earliest days of playing open mic nights at coffee houses, it was apparent to me that this music was as important to me as any music I've ever been involved in. It really encapsulates everything I want to do as an artist." He repeated this point in an interview with the Los Angeles Times.

However, after the "Rage Factor" celebratory show in Finsbury Park on June 6, 2010, after the campaign to get "Killing in the Name" to the No. 1 spot at Christmas, Zack de la Rocha stated that it was a "genuine possibility". Stating that they may use the momentum from the campaign to get back into the studio and write a follow-up record to 2000's Renegades after 10 years. When talking to NME, Zack de la Rocha said: "I think it's a genuine possibility, We have to get our heads around what we're going to do towards the end of the year and finish up on some other projects and we'll take it from there."

2009–2015: UK "Killing in the Name" Christmas campaign, European tour, and L.A. Rising 
In December 2009, a campaign was launched on Facebook by Jon Morter and his wife Tracy, in order to stop, most notably, The X Factor hits from becoming almost automatic Christmas number ones on the UK Singles Chart. It generated nationwide publicity and took the track "Killing in the Name" to the coveted Christmas number one slot in the UK Singles Chart, which had been dominated for four consecutive years from 2005 by winners from the popular TV show The X Factor. Before the chart was announced on December 20, 2009, the Facebook group membership stood at over 950,000, and was acknowledged (and supported) by Tom Morello, Dave Grohl, Paul McCartney, Muse, Fightstar, NME, John Lydon, Bill Bailey, Lenny Henry, BBC Radio 1, Hadouken!, the Prodigy, Stereophonics, BBC Radio 5 Live, and even the 2004 X Factor winner Steve Brookstein, amongst numerous others.
On the morning of December 17, Rage Against the Machine played a slightly censored version of "Killing in the Name" live on Radio 5 Live, but four repeats of 'Fuck you I won't do what you tell me' were aired before the song was pulled. During the interview before the song they reiterated their support for the campaign and their intentions to support charity with the proceeds. The campaign was ultimately successful, and "Killing in the Name" became the number-one single in the UK for Christmas 2009. Zack de la Rocha spoke to BBC One upon hearing the news, stating that:

The band also set a new record, achieving the biggest download sales total in a first week ever in the UK charts. de la Rocha also promised the band would perform a free concert in the UK sometime in 2010 to celebrate the achievement. True to their word, the band announced that they would be performing a free concert at Finsbury Park, London, on June 6, 2010. The concert, dubbed "The Rage Factor", gave away all the tickets by free photo registration to prevent touting over the weekend of the February 13–14, followed by an online lottery on February 17. This proved to be popular, with many users facing connection issues. The tickets were all allocated by 13:30 that same day. After allowing ticket holders to vote for who they wanted to be the support acts for "The Rage Factor", it was announced that Gogol Bordello, Gallows and Roots Manuva would support Rage Against the Machine at the concert.

In addition to the free gig at Finsbury Park, the band headlined European festivals in June 2010 including the Download Festival at Donington Park, England, Rock am Ring and Rock im Park in Germany and Rock in Rio Madrid in Spain. They also performed in Ireland on June 8 and the Netherlands on June 9. Zack de la Rocha had stated that it was a definite possibility that the band would record a new album, the first time since 2000's Renegades. Morter confirmed this, stating the discussions he and the band had backstage before the Finsbury Park gig saying the band did write new material, but they had no motivation to release them until now. de la Rocha mentioned the very strong reaction from the Download Festival 2010 audience as an incentive for releasing new material. In addition, the band returned to Los Angeles on July 23, 2010, for their first U.S. show in two years and their first hometown show in 10 years. The concert benefited Arizona organizations that are fighting the SB1070 immigration law. On the night of the show, a spokesperson announced to the crowd that ticket sales—all of which are non-profit to the bands—had raised $300,000. The band has been confirmed to do a short South American tour in October, performing at venues such as the SWU Festival in Brazil, the Maquinaria Festival in Chile, and Pepsi Music Festival in Argentina. It was the first time the band played in those countries.

During an interview with the Chilean newspaper La Tercera in October 2010, de la Rocha allegedly confirmed that a new album was in the works, with a possibility of a 2011 release. De la Rocha is reported as saying, "We are all bigger and more mature and we do not fall into the problems we faced 10 or 15 years ago. This is different and we project a lot: we are working on a new album due out next year, perhaps summer for the northern hemisphere". However, in early May 2011, guitarist Tom Morello said that the band was not working on a new album, but would not rule out the possibility of future studio work. "The band is not writing songs, the band is not in the studio", Morello told The Pulse of Radio. "We get along famously and we all, you know, intend to do more Rage Against the Machine stuff in the future, but beyond sort of working out a concert this year, there's nothing else on the schedule (for 2011)". The band created its own festival, the L.A. Rising. As Morello stated, the only Rage Against the Machine appearance for 2011 was a performance on July 30 at the L.A. Rising festival with El Gran Silencio, Immortal Technique, Lauryn Hill, Rise Against and Muse. During an interview on July 30, 2011, Commerford seemingly contradicted Morello's comments, stating that new material was being written, and specific plans for the next two years were in place.

In an October 2012 interview with TMZ, bassist Tim Commerford was asked if Rage Against the Machine was working on a new album. He simply responded, "maybe". Asked by TMZ again in November 2012 whether a new album was being worked on, Commerford replied "definitely maybe ... anything's possible". Later that month, however, Morello denied that they were working on new material, and stated that Rage Against the Machine had "no plans beyond" the reissue of their self-titled debut album. Morello said he would be open to recording new Rage Against the Machine material, but added that it was "not on the table right now".

The band announced on October 9 via their Facebook page that they would be releasing a special 20th anniversary box set to commemorate the group's debut album. The full box set contains never-before-released concert material, including the band's 2010 Finsbury Park show and footage from early in their career, as well as a digitally-remastered version of the album, b-sides and the original demo tape (on disc for the first time). The band released 3-disc and single-disc versions. The collection was released on November 27.

In an April 2014 interview with The Pulse of Radio, drummer Brad Wilk indicated that Rage Against the Machine's 2011 performance at L.A. Rising was their final show. In February 2015, Tim Commerford precised that uncertainty was typical of the band's functioning, speculating: "It could be tomorrow; it could be 10 years from now".

On October 16, 2015, the 2010 gig in Finsbury Park was released as a DVD and Blu-ray called Live at Finsbury Park.

2016–2019: Prophets of Rage and Rock & Roll Hall of Fame

In May 2016, the band launched a countdown website, prophetsofrage.com, with a clock counting down to June 1. Accompanying the clock was an image of a broken slash through a circle with silhouettes of five people all extending their arms and clenched fists with the hashtag "#takethepowerback" underneath the timer. This led to speculation of the return of the band later in the year. However, a source close to Rage Against the Machine told Rolling Stone that the Prophets of Rage website had nothing do with the announcement of a "Rage-specific reunion", but added that "some of the members" of the band were working on a project that would include live shows. It was later confirmed that Prophets of Rage were a new supergroup formed by Morello, Wilk and Commerford, with Chuck D of Public Enemy and B-Real of Cypress Hill. The band toured through the remainder of 2016 and played the songs of the three bands in which the members of this group participated in before.

Despite Morello, Wilk and Commerford's commitments to Prophets of Rage, the latter confirmed in a May 2016 interview with Rolling Stone that Rage Against the Machine had not split up, explaining, "We just do things our own way. Throughout our career, we never did what anyone wanted us to do. We never made the records people wanted us to make. We never played by the rules people wanted us to play by. And here we are, 25 years later, still a band. Clearly that means something. And if we did ever play or make new music or anything, it would be a very big deal. And there's a lot of bands that I've seen come along during that 25-year period that did everything the record companies and the powers-that-be wanted them to do, and they sold millions of records. But where are they now? They're gone." Morello added, "Right now ... the cold embers of Rage Against the Machine are now the burning fire of Prophets of Rage. Where Rage Against the Machine lives, is this summer in these songs that we are playing. And we have nothing but the greatest love and honor and respect for Zack de la Rocha, the brilliant lyricist of Rage Against the Machine, who is working on his own music, which I'm sure will be fantastic—he's a great artist in his own right. But where you're going to hear Rage Against the Machine is in Prophets of Rage."

In May 2018, Wilk stated that "nothing would make him happier" than if the band was to reunite, but stated "It's just really a matter of getting us all on the same page".

In November 2019, Chuck D and B-Real confirmed that Prophets of Rage had disbanded.

Rage Against the Machine was nominated for induction into the Rock & Roll Hall of Fame in their first year of eligibility in 2017 as well as in 2018, 2019, and 2021, although the bids failed.

2019–present: Second reunion 

On November 1, 2019, it was reported that Rage Against the Machine were reuniting for their first shows in nine years in the spring of 2020, including two appearances at that year's Coachella Valley Music and Arts Festival. On November 25, 2019, an alleged leaked tour poster made its way online indicating the band would be going on a world tour throughout 2020. This was later debunked by Australian-based publication Wall of Sound who broke the news that a concert poster troll photoshopped and released it online as a prank.

On February 10, 2020, Rage Against the Machine announced more worldwide dates for the 2020 reunion tour, now named the "Public Service Announcement" Tour. It was scheduled to run from March 26 through September 12, making it the band's first full-length world tour in 20 years, after they completed the promotional cycle for their third album The Battle of Los Angeles. The supporting act on all shows but Chicago would be rap duo Run the Jewels. On March 12, 2020, the band postponed the first leg of the reunion tour due to the COVID-19 pandemic; this tour was eventually postponed to the summer of 2021. On May 1, 2020, the band announced that they had rescheduled the remaining dates of their reunion tour to 2021. They were also due to headline the Reading and Leeds Festivals, which would have been Rage Against the Machine's first UK appearance in ten years, but it was announced on May 12, 2020 that the festival was cancelled. Despite having rescheduled all of their tour dates, Rage Against the Machine was initially still scheduled to play Coachella Valley Music and Arts Festival, which had been postponed from April to October 2020 before it was officially cancelled that June. On April 8, 2021, it was announced that the "Public Service Announcement" Tour had once again been rescheduled to the spring and summer of 2022.

By June 11, 2020, every Rage Against the Machine album had entered the top 30 of Apple Music's Rock Albums chart, and their self-titled debut album had entered the Billboard Top 200 at number 174. The resurgence of interest in the band's music and politics was widely attributed to renewed worldwide Black Lives Matter protests following the murder of George Floyd in Minneapolis by law enforcement.

When asked in a September 2020 interview with Yahoo! Entertainment if Rage Against the Machine were going to release new material, Morello stated, with a laugh, "I promise you, if there is ever any Rage Against the Machine recording news, our representatives will reach out to you!"

On July 9, 2022, Rage Against the Machine played their first concert in 11 years at Alpine Valley Music Theatre in East Troy, Wisconsin. On August 11, 2022, the band announced they had canceled the UK and European leg of their tour due to a leg injury de la Rocha sustained during a show, described by Glen E. Friedman as an Achilles tendon rupture. On October 4, 2022, the band further announced they had canceled the remaining shows on the 2023 North American leg of the tour due to the severity of de la Rocha's injury.

Musical style and influences

Inspired from early heavy metal instrumentation, Rage Against the Machine has been influenced by a variety of music, including acts like Led Zeppelin, Bob Dylan, U2, the Red Hot Chili Peppers, Iron Maiden, Kiss, Black Sabbath/Ozzy Osbourne, the Police, Devo, Living Colour, Queen, the Brothers Johnson and Wayne Shorter. They are also said to be influenced by hip hop acts such as Afrika Bambaataa, Run-DMC, Public Enemy, and the Beastie Boys, punk rock such as the Clash, Minor Threat, the Teen Idles, Bad Brains, the Dead Kennedys, Black Flag, the Sex Pistols, Fugazi and Bad Religion, and crossover bands like Suicidal Tendencies and Urban Dance Squad. Rage Against the Machine has been noted for its "fiercely polemical music, which brewed sloganeering leftist rants against corporate America, cultural imperialism, and government oppression into a Molotov cocktail of punk rock, hip hop, and thrash." Zack de la Rocha's lyrics and choruses are defined by a heavy use of sloganeering and repetition on songs like "Bulls on Parade", "Guerrilla Radio", "Testify", and "Down Rodeo". Guitarist Tom Morello, on the other hand, was considered the guitar player, but also the DJ in Rage.

Rage Against the Machine has been described as rap metal, rap rock, funk metal, fusion, alternative metal, hard rock, nu metal, heavy metal and alternative rock.
Although the band has been described as nu metal, Rage Against the Machine is often instead considered a predecessor to nu metal.

Political views and activism

The members of Rage Against the Machine are well known for their leftist anti-authoritarian and revolutionary political views, and almost all of the band's songs focus on these views. Key to the band's identity, Rage Against the Machine has voiced viewpoints highly critical of the domestic and foreign policies of current and previous U.S. governments. Throughout its existence, Rage Against the Machine and its individual members participated in political protests and other activism to advocate these beliefs. The band sees its music as a vehicle for social activism; De la Rocha explained, "I'm interested in spreading those ideas through art, because music has the power to cross borders, to break military sieges and to establish real dialogue." Morello said of wage slavery in America:

Some critics have accused the group of hypocrisy for voicing commitment to leftist causes while being millionaires signed to Epic Records, a subsidiary of media conglomerate Sony Music. Infectious Grooves released a song called "Do What I Tell Ya!" which mocks lyrics from "Killing in the Name", accusing the band of being hypocrites. In response to such critiques, Morello stated:

De la Rocha stated:

For their 2020 reunion tour, the band announced all profits from their first three shows—in El Paso, Texas; Las Cruces, New Mexico; and Glendale, Arizona—would be donated to immigrant rights organizations in the US. For subsequent shows, 10% of the base ticket price and 100% of proceeds after fees and base ticket price were reserved for charities local to each city they were performing in.

On June 24, 2022, the band announced that they would donate $475,000 to reproductive rights groups in Wisconsin and Illinois after the Supreme Court's ruling to overturn Roe v. Wade. During their July 9 concert in Wisconsin, the band further expressed opposition to the overturning of Roe v. Wade using screened images of text including "Abort the Supreme Court" and "Forced birth in a country where Black birth-givers experience maternal mortality two to three times higher than that of white birth-givers. Forced birth in a country where gun violence is the number one cause of death among children and teenagers."

Members 
 Zack de la Rocha – lead vocals
 Tom Morello – guitars
 Tim Commerford – bass, backing vocals
 Brad Wilk – drums, percussion

Discography 

Studio albums
 Rage Against the Machine (1992)
 Evil Empire (1996)
 The Battle of Los Angeles (1999)
 Renegades (2000)

Awards and nominations 
Rage Against the Machine has won two Grammy Awards with six nominations altogether. During 2008, the band was also inducted into the Kerrang! "Hall of Fame". As well during 2010, Rage Against the Machine were bestowed with NMEs Heroes of the Year Award. The band has also received three nominations from the MTV Video Music Awards, but has yet to win an award. Rage Against The Machine have been nominated for the Rock and Roll Hall of Fame in 2018, 2019 and 2021.

In 2021, the UK Official Charts Company announced that "Killing in the Name" had been named as the 'UK's Favourite Christmas Number 1 of All Time' in a poll commissioned to celebrate the 70th Official Christmas Number 1 race (and as a tie-in with the book The Official Christmas No. 1 Singles Book by Michael Mulligan).Grammy Awards|-
|rowspan="2"|  || "Tire Me" || Best Metal Performance || 
|-
| "Bulls on Parade" || rowspan= "2" | Best Hard Rock Performance || 
|-
|  || "People of the Sun" || 
|-
|  || "No Shelter" || Best Metal Performance || 
|-
|rowspan="2"|  || "Guerrilla Radio" || Best Hard Rock Performance || 
|-
| The Battle of Los Angeles || Best Rock Album || 
|-
|  || "Renegades of Funk" || Best Hard Rock Performance || MTV Video Music Awards|-
|  || "Bulls on Parade" || rowspan= "3" | Best Rock Video || 
|-
|  || "People of the Sun" || 
|-
|  || "Sleep Now in the Fire" || NME Awards|-
| 2010 || Rage Against the Machine || Heroes of the Year || Kerrang! Awards|-
|| 2008 || Rage Against the Machine || Hall of Fame || Classic Rock Roll of Honour Awards|-
|rowspan="2"| 2010 || Rage Against the Machine || Band of the Year || 
|-
| Christmas Number One and Free Concert || Event of the Year || Rock and Roll Hall of Fame'

|-
|| 2019 || Rage Against the Machine || Rock and Roll Hall of Fame ||

Notes

References

Further reading 
 
 
 "Anti-Capitalist Critique and Travelling poetry in the Works of Lorna Dee Cervantes and Rage Against the Machine.", Alexander, Donna Maria

External links 

 
 
 

 
Epic Records artists
Grammy Award winners
Kerrang! Awards winners
Musical groups disestablished in 2000
Musical groups established in 1991
Musical groups from Los Angeles
Musical groups reestablished in 2007
Musical groups disestablished in 2011
Musical groups reestablished in 2019
Musical quartets
NME Awards winners
American alternative metal musical groups
American funk metal musical groups
Rap metal musical groups
Rap rock groups
Alternative rock groups from California
Hard rock musical groups from California
Nu metal musical groups from California
Revelation Records artists
Socialism in the United States
Anti-consumerist groups
Political music groups
1991 establishments in California